Clyde Elementary School is the name of several elementary schools in the United States. These include:

 Clyde Elementary School (North Carolina), in Clyde, North Carolina
 Clyde Elementary School (Ohio), in Clyde, Ohio

See also
 Clyde High School (disambiguation)
 Clyde Campbell Elementary School, in Hickory, North Carolina